The 2011 Championship League was a professional non-ranking snooker tournament that was played from 3 January to 24 March 2011 at the Crondon Park Golf Club in Stock, England.

Matthew Stevens won in the final 3–1 against Shaun Murphy and earned a place in the 2011 Premier League Snooker.

Prize fund
The breakdown of prize money for this year is shown below: 

Group 1–7
Winner: £3,000
Runner-up: £2,000
Semi-final: £1,000
Frame-win (league stage): £100
Frame-win (play-offs): £300
Highest break: £500
Winners group
Winner: £10,000
Runner-up: £5,000
Semi-final: £3,000
Frame-win: £300
Highest break: £1,000

Tournament total: £189,400

Group one
Group one matches were played on 3 and 4 January 2011. Mark Selby was the first player to qualify for the winners group.

Matches

John Higgins 3–0 Mark Williams
Shaun Murphy 0–3 Mark Selby
Ali Carter 3–2 Stephen Maguire
Graeme Dott 2–3 John Higgins
Mark Williams 2–3 Shaun Murphy
Mark Selby 1–3 Ali Carter
Stephen Maguire 3–1 Graeme Dott
John Higgins 1–3 Shaun Murphy
Mark Williams 3–1 Mark Selby
Ali Carter 3–0 Graeme Dott
Shaun Murphy 2–3 Graeme Dott
Stephen Maguire 2–3 Mark Selby
John Higgins 3–1 Stephen Maguire
Mark Williams 3–0 Ali Carter
Mark Selby 3–1 Graeme Dott
Shaun Murphy 3–0 Stephen Maguire
Mark Williams 3–0 Graeme Dott
John Higgins 3–1 Ali Carter
Shaun Murphy 1–3 Ali Carter
Mark Williams 3–1 Stephen Maguire
John Higgins 3–2 Mark Selby

Table

Play-offs

Group two
Group two matches were played on 5 and 6 January 2011. Mark Williams was the second player to qualify for the winners group.

Matches

Ali Carter 1–3 John Higgins
Mark Williams 3–0 Shaun Murphy
Neil Robertson 0–3 Ronnie O'Sullivan
Jamie Cope 0–3 Ali Carter
John Higgins 3–2 Mark Williams
Shaun Murphy 3–2 Neil Robertson
Ronnie O'Sullivan 3–0 Jamie Cope
Ali Carter 1–3 Mark Williams
John Higgins 3–2 Shaun Murphy
Neil Robertson 3–2 Jamie Cope
Mark Williams 3–0 Jamie Cope
Ronnie O'Sullivan 3–2 Shaun Murphy
Ali Carter 2–3 Ronnie O'Sullivan
John Higgins 3–1 Neil Robertson
Shaun Murphy 2–3 Jamie Cope
Mark Williams 3–0 Ronnie O'Sullivan
John Higgins 3–0 Jamie Cope
Ali Carter 3–1 Neil Robertson
Mark Williams 3–1 Neil Robertson
John Higgins 0–3 Ronnie O'Sullivan
Ali Carter 1–3 Shaun Murphy

Table

Play-offs

Group three
Group three matches were played on 24 and 25 January 2011. Ronnie O'Sullivan withdrew from the tournament ahead of this group and was replaced by Stuart Bingham. Shaun Murphy was the third player to qualify for the winners group.

Matches

Stuart Bingham 0–3 John Higgins
Shaun Murphy 1–3 Ali Carter
Mark King 1–3 Peter Ebdon
Marco Fu 1–3 Stuart Bingham
John Higgins 0–3 Shaun Murphy
Ali Carter 3–0 Mark King
Peter Ebdon 1–3 Marco Fu
Stuart Bingham 2–3 Shaun Murphy
John Higgins 1–3 Ali Carter
Mark King 3–2 Marco Fu
Shaun Murphy 3–1 Marco Fu
Peter Ebdon 3–1 Ali Carter
Stuart Bingham 3–1 Peter Ebdon
John Higgins 2–3 Mark King
Ali Carter 3–1 Marco Fu
Shaun Murphy 1–3 Peter Ebdon
John Higgins 0–3 Marco Fu
Stuart Bingham 1–3 Mark King
John Higgins 3–0 Peter Ebdon
Shaun Murphy 3–1 Mark King
Stuart Bingham 2–3 Ali Carter

Table

Play-offs

Group four
Group four matches were played on 26 and 27 January 2011. Ali Carter was the fourth player to qualify for the winners group.

Matches

Mark King 0–3 Ali Carter
Peter Ebdon 1–3 Marco Fu
Stephen Hendry 1–3 Mark Allen
Matthew Stevens 3–0 Mark King
Ali Carter 3–0 Peter Ebdon
Marco Fu 3–1 Stephen Hendry
Mark Allen 1–3 Matthew Stevens
Mark King 3–2 Peter Ebdon
Ali Carter 1–3 Marco Fu
Stephen Hendry 2–3 Matthew Stevens
Peter Ebdon 3–1 Matthew Stevens
Mark Allen 3–1 Marco Fu
Mark King 3–2 Mark Allen
Ali Carter 3–2 Stephen Hendry
Marco Fu 1–3 Matthew Stevens
Peter Ebdon 1–3 Mark Allen
Ali Carter 2–3 Matthew Stevens
Mark King 1–3 Stephen Hendry
Peter Ebdon 3–2 Stephen Hendry
Ali Carter 3–0 Mark Allen
Mark King 3–2 Marco Fu

Table

Play-offs

Group five
Group five matches were played on 28 February and 1 March 2011. Marco Fu was to play in this group, but he moved to group seven and was replaced by Ryan Day, who went on to win the group.

Matches

Mark Allen 3–0 Matthew Stevens
Ryan Day 0–3 Mark King
Ding Junhui 3–0 Ricky Walden
Liang Wenbo 2–3 Mark Allen
Matthew Stevens 3–2 Ryan Day
Mark King 2–3 Ding Junhui
Ricky Walden 0–3 Liang Wenbo
Mark Allen 1–3 Ryan Day
Matthew Stevens 0–3 Mark King
Ding Junhui 1–3 Liang Wenbo
Ryan Day 3–2 Liang Wenbo
Ricky Walden 3–2 Mark King
Mark Allen 3–0 Ricky Walden
Matthew Stevens 3–0 Ding Junhui
Mark King 3–1 Liang Wenbo
Ryan Day 3–2 Ricky Walden
Matthew Stevens 0–3 Liang Wenbo
Mark Allen 3–2 Ding Junhui
Ryan Day 3–1 Ding Junhui
Matthew Stevens 3–1 Ricky Walden
Mark Allen 3–0 Mark King

Table

Play-offs

Group six
Group six matches were played on 2 and 3 March 2011. Mark Allen was the sixth player to qualify for the winners group.

Matches

Mark Allen 2–3 Liang Wenbo
Mark King 3–0 Matthew Stevens
Judd Trump 3–2 Mark Davis
Stephen Lee 3–2 Mark Allen
Liang Wenbo 2–3 Mark King
Matthew Stevens 2–3 Judd Trump
Mark Davis 3–2 Stephen Lee
Mark Allen 3–0 Mark King
Liang Wenbo 2–3 Matthew Stevens
Judd Trump 2–3 Stephen Lee
Mark King 0–3 Stephen Lee
Mark Davis 0–3 Matthew Stevens
Mark Allen 3–0 Mark Davis
Liang Wenbo 3–1 Judd Trump
Matthew Stevens 3–0 Stephen Lee
Mark King 3–1 Mark Davis
Liang Wenbo 1–3 Stephen Lee
Mark Allen 3–0 Judd Trump
Mark King 3–1 Judd Trump
Liang Wenbo 3–0 Mark Davis
Mark Allen 1–3 Matthew Stevens

Table

Play-offs

Group seven
Group seven matches were played on 21 and 22 March 2011. Matthew Stevens was the last player to qualify for the winners group.

Matches

Stephen Lee 3–2 Marco Fu
Mark King 3–1 Liang Wenbo
Martin Gould 0–3 Andrew Higginson
Matthew Stevens 1–3 Stephen Lee
Matthew Stevens 3–2 Mark King
Liang Wenbo 2–3 Martin Gould
Andrew Higginson 0–3 Marco Fu
Stephen Lee 3–2 Mark King
Matthew Stevens 2–3 Liang Wenbo
Martin Gould 0–3 Marco Fu
Mark King 3–1 Marco Fu
Andrew Higginson 0–3 Liang Wenbo
Stephen Lee 0–3 Andrew Higginson
Matthew Stevens 3–1 Martin Gould
Liang Wenbo 3–1 Marco Fu
Mark King 2–3 Andrew Higginson
Matthew Stevens 3–1 Marco Fu
Stephen Lee 3–1 Martin Gould
Mark King 1–3 Martin Gould
Matthew Stevens 3–2 Andrew Higginson
Stephen Lee  0–3 Liang Wenbo

Table

Play-offs

Winners group
The matches of the winners group were played on 23 and 24 March 2011. Matthew Stevens has qualified for the 2011 Premier League.

Matches

Mark Selby 1–3 Mark Williams
Shaun Murphy 3–1 Ali Carter
Ryan Day 2–3 Mark Allen
Matthew Stevens 1–3 Mark Selby
Mark Williams 1–3 Shaun Murphy
Ali Carter 3–0 Ryan Day
Mark Allen 0–3 Matthew Stevens
Mark Selby 3–2 Shaun Murphy
Mark Williams 2–3 Ali Carter
Ryan Day 0–3 Matthew Stevens
Shaun Murphy 2–3 Matthew Stevens
Mark Allen 3–2 Ali Carter
Mark Selby 2–3 Mark Allen
Mark Williams 3–2 Ryan Day
Ali Carter 2–3 Matthew Stevens
Shaun Murphy 3–1 Mark Allen
Mark Williams 1–3 Matthew Stevens
Mark Selby 1–3 Ryan Day
Shaun Murphy 2–3 Ryan Day
Mark Williams 3–0 Mark Allen
Mark Selby 0–3 Ali Carter

Table

Play-offs

Century breaks
Total: 86

 143 (W), 141, 138 (2), 137, 119, 107  Mark Williams
 142 (1), 138, 133, 109, 106, 104  John Higgins
 140 (6), 131, 117, 104  Liang Wenbo
 139 (3), 137, 122, 112, 107, 101, 101, 100  Shaun Murphy
 138 (2), 132, 115, 113, 108, 101  Ronnie O'Sullivan
 136 (5), 127, 122, 112, 108, 105  Mark King
 137  Graeme Dott
 136 (5), 134 (4), 134 (7), 128, 126, 122, 116, 111, 108, 106, 101, 101, 100  Matthew Stevens
 135, 124  Mark Selby
 133  Neil Robertson
 133, 126, 112, 109, 108, 102  Marco Fu
 131, 121, 120, 119, 118, 115, 103, 101, 101, 100, 100  Mark Allen
 129  Stephen Hendry
 122, 115  Ding Junhui
 121, 117, 108, 102, 101, 101, 100  Ali Carter
 117  Stephen Lee
 114, 112, 102  Ryan Day
 103  Martin Gould
 102  Andrew Higginson

Bold: highest break in the indicated group.

Winnings 

Green: Won the group. Bold: Highest break in the group. All prize money in GBP.

References

External links
 

2011
Championship League
Championship League